The Accles-Turrell was an English automobile built between 1899 and 1901 in Perry Bar, Birmingham, England and from 1901 to 1902 in Ashton-under-Lyne.

The company began in 1899 when the British pioneer motorist Charles McRobie Turrell, who had helped organise the 1896 London-Brighton Emancipation Run, joined Accles Ltd, a Birmingham engineering company. The car was a 3 hp two-seater light carriage equipped with a single-cylinder engine of Accles manufacture and a body by Arthur Mulliner of Northampton.  The engine drove the rear wheels by a belt to the 3-speed gearbox and chain to the wheels. The top speed was claimed to be .

In 1901 a larger four-seat 10/15 hp car was made and the rights to this "vibrationless, very simple, quiet and efficient" "New Turrell" car were acquired by Pollock Ltd. of Ashton-under-Lyne. The car had a flat twin 10/15 hp engine under the front seat driving the rear wheels through a two-speed constant mesh gearbox.  The car was later made by the Autocar Construction Company and sold as the Hermes.

Accles and Pollock soon joined forces to become the tube-making company Accles & Pollock. The Accles & Pollock tube brand is currently owned by Tyco.

See also
 List of car manufacturers of the United Kingdom
 The Coventry Motor Company

References

Further reading
 

Veteran vehicles
Defunct motor vehicle manufacturers of England
Defunct companies based in Birmingham, West Midlands
Defunct companies based in Manchester